Sound Hierarchy is an album by the Brazilian jazz saxophonist Ivo Perelman, recorded in 1996 and released on the Music & Arts label. He leads a quartet with pianist Marilyn Crispell, drummer Gerry Hemingway and bassist William Parker.

Reception

In his review for AllMusic, Alex Henderson states: "Short of Charles Gayle, you won't find any 1990s avant-garde jazz that is more incendiary, ferocious and violent than Sound Hierarchy."

The Penguin Guide to Jazz notes that "Crispell is too strong a personality to settle for the kind of subsidiary role that Perelman needs, and Hemingway's rhythms are too bracingly inventive - they offer Perelman a distraction rather than fed lines."

Track listing
All titles are collective works except as indicated
 "Frozen Tears" - 18:54
 "Sound Hierarchy" - 7:29
 "Datchki Dandara"  (Ivo Perelman) - 12:20
 "Fragments" - 17:33

Personnel
Ivo Perelman - tenor sax, mouthpiece on 2
Marilyn Crispell - piano
Gerry Hemingway - drums, voice on 2
William Parker - bass

References

1997 albums
Ivo Perelman albums
Music & Arts albums